The 2019–20 AHL season was the 84th season of the American Hockey League. The regular season began October 4, 2019, and was officially cancelled on May 11, 2020. The 2020 Calder Cup playoffs, which was also cancelled, would have followed the conclusion of the regular season. The league suspended play on March 12, 2020, due to the COVID-19 pandemic in North America, and was not able to resume play.  The Milwaukee Admirals claimed the league's regular-season trophy, the Macgregor Kilpatrick Trophy, their second regular-season championship.

This was the final season under David Andrews' 26-year tenure as the president of the league. He was succeeded by Scott Howson.

League changes
For the first time since 2012, there were no team changes in the offseason. The league also retained the same four division alignment of 31 teams, with teams in each division playing 76 games except for the seven-team Pacific Division with 68 games each. The Macgregor Kilpatrick Trophy for the regular season champion was awarded based on points percentage.

Coaching changes

Final standings

Eastern Conference 
Final standings as of March 11, 2020

Western Conference 
Final standings as of March 11, 2020

Statistical leaders

Leading skaters 
The following players are sorted by points, then goals. Final as of March 11, 2020.

GP = Games played; G = Goals; A = Assists; Pts = Points; +/– = Plus-minus; PIM = Penalty minutes

Leading goaltenders 
The following goaltenders with a minimum 1200 minutes played lead the league in goals against average. Final as of March 11, 2020.

GP = Games played; TOI = Time on ice (in minutes); SA = Shots against; GA = Goals against; SO = Shutouts; GAA = Goals against average; SV% = Save percentage; W = Wins; L = Losses; OT = Overtime/shootout loss

Calder Cup playoffs

The 2020 Calder Cup playoffs was a planned playoff tournament following the conclusion of the regular season to determine the champions of the American Hockey League. On May 11, 2020, American Hockey League President and Chief Executive Officer David Andrews cancelled the remainder of the season and the Calder Cup playoffs due to the COVID-19 pandemic. It is the first time in league history that the Calder Cup was not awarded.

AHL awards

All-Star Teams
First All-Star Team
Kaapo Kahkonen (G) – Iowa
Jake Bean (D) – Charlotte
Brennan Menell (D) – Iowa
Reid Boucher (F) – Utica
Josh Norris (F) – Belleville
Sam Anas (F) – Iowa

Second All-Star Team
Connor Ingram (G) – Milwaukee
Jacob MacDonald (D) – Colorado
Brogan Rafferty (D) – Utica
Gerald Mayhew (F) – Iowa
Alex Barre-Boulet (F) – Syracuse
Drake Batherson (F) – Belleville

All-Rookie Team
Cayden Primeau (G) – Laval
Joey Keane (D) – Hartford/Charlotte
Brogan Rafferty (D) – Utica
Alex Formenton (F) – Belleville
Josh Norris (F) – Belleville
Jack Studnicka (F) – Providence

See also
List of AHL seasons
2019 in ice hockey
2020 in ice hockey

References

External links
AHL official site

2019-20 season
American Hockey League seasons
2019–20 in American ice hockey by league
2019–20 in Canadian ice hockey by league
AHL season